Owen Oliver Coll (born 9 April 1976) is an Irish former professional footballer who played as a central defender.

Career

Club career
After playing non-League football with Enfield, Coll signed for Tottenham Hotspur in 1994. After two seasons with Tottenham, which included making 3 European appearances and a loan spell at Yeovil Town, Coll moved to AFC Bournemouth, where he made a total of 24 appearances in the Football League. Coll later returned to non-League football, playing for Yeovil Town, Stevenage Borough, Aldershot Town, Grays Athletic, Hitchin Town and Cheshunt.

Coll retired from football in the summer of 2004.

International career
Coll earned three caps for the Irish under-21 team.

References

1976 births
Living people
Republic of Ireland association footballers
Republic of Ireland under-21 international footballers
Enfield F.C. players
Tottenham Hotspur F.C. players
AFC Bournemouth players
Yeovil Town F.C. players
Stevenage F.C. players
Aldershot Town F.C. players
Grays Athletic F.C. players
Hitchin Town F.C. players
Cheshunt F.C. players
English Football League players
Association football central defenders